Constatine Ibrahim Akello (born 31 March 1985) is a Kenyan former cricketer. 

Akello was born at Nairobi in March 1985. In November 2011, he toured Namibia with Kenya and played in four Twenty20 matches against the Namibia national cricket team at Windhoek, taking a single wicket from 11 overs bowled across the four matches with his right-arm medium-fast bowling. He had previously toured the Netherlands in September 2011 for their first-class and One Day International series, part of the ICC Intercontinental Cup, with the first-class fixture being abandoned and Akello not featuring in the one-day series.

References

External links

1985 births
Living people
People from Nairobi
Kenyan cricketers